Andrew Edward Bellemer (July 3, 1903 – April 12, 1960) was a Canadian professional ice hockey player who played 15 games in the National Hockey League with the Montreal Maroons during the 1932–33 season. The rest of his career, which lasted from 1925 to 1943, was spent in various minor leagues. He was born in Penetanguishene, Ontario.

Career statistics

Regular season and playoffs

External links 
 
Obituary at LostHockey.com

1903 births
1960 deaths
Canadian ice hockey defencemen
Cleveland Indians (IHL) players
Dallas Texans (AHA) players
Ice hockey people from Simcoe County
Kansas City Greyhounds players
Montreal Maroons players
Ontario Hockey Association Senior A League (1890–1979) players
People from Penetanguishene
Rochester Cardinals players
Tulsa Oilers (AHA) players
Windsor Bulldogs (1929–1936) players
Windsor Bulldogs (CPHL) players